Aamir Bashir is an Indian actor, film producer, and director.

Early life and education
Bashir was born and raised in Kashmir, the son of the retired Chief Justice of Jammu High Court. He is a graduate of St. Stephen's College, University of Delhi.

Career
His acting career began with a small role in the Bhanwar TV series, and several TV advertisements, which led to his film debut, Split Wide Open (1999) and the telefilm, Doordarshan Srinagar.  He appeared in the 2003 film Armaan. Acclaim came his way in 2008, with the thriller, A Wednesday, where he played the role of a police inspector; the film also won him a Screen Awards nomination for Best Actor in a Supporting Role.

Bashir was set to play Shahrukh Khan's younger brother in the film My Name is Khan, but was denied a visa to the United States in December 2008, where the film was being shot. He was eventually replaced by Jimmy Sheirgill as Khan's younger brother.

In 2010, Bashir's directorial debut Harud premiered at the 2010 Toronto International Film Festival. The film stars Reza Naji and Shahnawaz Bhat and takes place in Kashmir. It won the National Award for the Best Urdu Feature Film at the 60th National Film Awards.

He had a recurring role in Netflix's first Indian Original series - Sacred Games. In 2019 he reprised his role in the second season of Sacred Games, and appeared in another Amazon Prime series, Inside Edge. Later that year he joined the cast of Mira Nair's A Suitable Boy.

Filmography

Acting
 Dolly Kitty Aur Woh Chamakte Sitare (2020) - Amit
 Inside Edge Season 2 (2019)  - Bhaisahab/Yashvardhan Patil
 Laal Kaptaan (2019) - Adham Khan
 Sacred Games (2018) - Majid Khan
 Gurgaon (2017) - Bhupi
 Haider (2014) - Liyaqat Lone
 Future To Bright Hai Ji (2012) - Ajay Kumar
 Peepli Live (2010) - Vivek
 Raat Gayi Baat Gayi (2009) - Prasad
 A Wednesday (2008) - Jai Pratap Singh - PI
 The Great Indian Butterfly (2007) - Krish
 Frozen (2007) - Commanding Officer
 Pyaar Ke Side Effects (2006) -  Kapil Sharma
 Rishtey (TV series)  "Sirf Tum" Season 1
 Isse Kehte Hai Golmaal Ghar (TV Series) 2004
 Armaan (2003) -  Dr. Sanjay
 Sarhadein (TV series) (2002)
 Clever and Lonely (2002) - Aditya
 Split Wide Open (1999) - The Husband
 Alpviram (TV series) (1998)
 Antaral (TV series) (2000)
 A Suitable Boy (2020) Netflix series

Directing
 Harud (2010)
 The Winter Within (2022) The film will premiere at 27th Busan International Film Festival in New Currents section and compete for New Currents Award, the FIPRESCI Award, the NETPAC Award, and the KB New Currents Audience Award.

Awards
 2012: National Film Award for Best Feature Film in Urdu: Harud

References

External links

 
 
 "Why Aamir Bashir was taken aback" - The Times of India

Indian male film actors
Living people
St. Stephen's College, Delhi alumni
Male actors in Hindi cinema
Kashmiri people
Kashmiri Muslims
Indian people of Kashmiri descent
Indian male television actors
Indian film directors
Male actors from Jammu and Kashmir
21st-century Indian male actors
Year of birth missing (living people)